The Candace Award is an award that was given from 1982 to 1992 by the National Coalition of 100 Black Women (NCBW) to "Black role models of uncommon distinction who have set a standard of excellence for young people of all races". Candace (pronounced can-DAY-say) was the ancient Ethiopian title for queen or empress. "Candace, queen of the Ethiopians" is mentioned in the Bible: Philip meets "a eunuch of great authority" under her reign and converts him to Christianity (Acts 8:27-39). The awards ceremony was held each year at the Metropolitan Museum of Art in New York City. 

The award was established in 1982 as part of an effort to increase recognition of the achievements of Black intellectuals. The award was given annually to several women and one man in select categories including arts and letters, business, community service, economic development, education, health, science, history, and technology. Sponsorship was provided by The Paddington Corporation (through their brand Baileys Irish Cream) and then by AT&T. Tiffany & Co. customized engraved crystal for the awards ceremony. The President of the NCBW, Jewell Jackson McCabe, founded the award.

Recipients 1982–92 
The following people received the Candace Award between 1982 and 1992.

References 

Awards honoring African Americans
Awards established in 1982
Awards disestablished in 1992
1982 establishments in the United States
1992 disestablishments in the United States